Saint Edburga of Minster-in-Thanet (also known as Eadburh and Bugga) was a princess of Wessex, and abbess of  Minster-in-Thanet. She is regarded as a saint.

Life 
Edburga was the only daughter of King Centwine and Queen Engyth of Wessex. According to Stephen of Ripon, Engyth was a sister of Queen Iurminburh, second wife of King Ecgfrith of Northumbria. Centwine was not a Christian, but towards the end of his reign, converted and became a monk.

Edburga was a friend and student of Saint Mildrith, abbess of Minster-in-Thanet.<ref name=Farmer>[https://www.oxfordreference.com/view/10.1093/oi/authority.20110803095741852 "Edburga (Eadburh, Bugga) of Minster", The Oxford Dictionary of Saints (5 rev) (David Farmer, ed.) OUP, 2011] </ref> She was reputed to be zealous in the pursuit of knowledge. In 716, Edburga became a Benedictine nun at the abbey.

She corresponded with Saint Boniface and Lullus.  Between 718 and 720 her mother wrote to Boniface and soon after, in 720, Edburga herself wrote to him, sending him fifty shillings and an altar cloth. In 716, Boniface addresses to her a letter containing the famous Vision of the Monk of Wenlock''.

She succeeded Mildrith as the abbess around 733, and presided over about seventy nuns. During her time as an abbess she was able to secure royal charters for the abbey, as well as having a new church (saints Peter and Paul) built there, to provide a shrine for the relics of St Mildrith.

References

External links
  / 
Catholic Forum

751 deaths
Benedictine abbesses
Year of birth missing
8th-century deaths
West Saxon saints
Kentish saints
Anglo-Saxon abbesses
8th-century Christian saints
8th-century English nuns
Christian female saints of the Middle Ages
People from Minster-in-Thanet